KZCR (103.3 FM, "Z103.3") is a radio station broadcasting a mainstream rock/adult album alternative format hybrid, reminiscent of the defunct album oriented rock format, serving Fergus Falls, Minnesota. The station is currently owned by Leighton Broadcasting, through licensee Leighton Radio Holdings, Inc.

The station is also affiliated with the Z103 Bar & Grill. In the summer of 2011, KZCR changed its slogan from "Z103.3, The Heart of Rock" to "Z103, Minnesota's Custom Rock". The station plays a wide span of music ranging from the 1970s through today, including deep album cuts and new music. The genres include classic rock, deep album cuts, cover songs, new wave, punk rock, glam metal, modern rock/alternative and adult album alternative. The station is an affiliate of the weekly syndicated Pink Floyd program "Floydian Slip."

The studios and offices are west of downtown Fergus Falls, at 728 Western Avenue North, near I-94. The transmitter is between Fergus Falls and Detroit Lakes near Rothsay, so its signal reaches both Fergus Falls and Detroit Lakes and a rimshot signal to the Fargo-Moorhead metropolitan area.

It was announced on April 7, 2015 that KZCR and nine other Result Radio stations had been sold to St. Cloud-based Leighton Broadcasting, with the Leighton group slated to take over the stations on August 1, 2015.

References

External links
Z103.3 official website
Z103 Bar & Grill
KZCR scoped aircheck

Radio stations in Minnesota
Mainstream rock radio stations in the United States
Fergus Falls, Minnesota